Talisman Mining is an Australian mining corporation. It is publicly traded on the Australian Securities Exchange.

References

Companies listed on the Australian Securities Exchange
Mining companies of Australia